TERA is a shielded twisted pair connector for use with Category 7 twisted-pair data cables, developed by The Siemon Company and standardised in 2003 by the International Electrotechnical Commission (IEC) with the reference IEC 61076-3-104.
The 2006 revision of the standard extended the characterised performance up to 1000 MHz.
The connector has a different footprint from the more common 8P8C connector.

TERA is also a useful interface for broadcast communications technology (BCT). This connector allows for cable sharing, permitting users to integrate video, voice and data services over a single cabling link.

See also
 GG45 or ARJ45, a connector for high-speed Category 7 cable

References

External links
 

Networking hardware
IEC 61076-3